Marco Borges is an author, and self-described exercise physiologist and the founder & CEO of 22 Days Nutrition.

Borges has appeared on multiple shows and articles, promoting his program.

Publications
Power Moves: The Four Motions to Transform Your Body for Life (2009)
The 22-Day Revolution Cookbook: The Ultimate Resource for Unleashing the Life-Changing Health Benefits of a Plant-Based Diet (2016)

References

American food writers
Living people
Year of birth missing (living people)